Odites consecrata is a moth in the family Depressariidae. It was described by Edward Meyrick in 1917. It is found in Madagascar.

The wingspan is about 15 mm. The forewings are glossy whitish-grey ochreous, the costa suffused with whitish from the base to three-fourths. The hindwings are ochreous whitish.

References

Moths described in 1917
Odites
Taxa named by Edward Meyrick